Mutford and Lothingland Rural District was a rural district within the administrative county of East Suffolk between 1894 and 1934. It was created out of the earlier Mutford and Lothingland rural sanitary district. It was named after the historic hundred of Mutford and Lothingland, whose boundaries it closely matched.

In 1904 a new Oulton Broad Urban District was created out of parts of Carlton Colville and Oulton parishes. Oulton Broad UD was absorbed by the Municipal Borough of Lowestoft in 1919.

In 1934, under a County Review Order, Mutford and Lothingland Rural District was abolished and its parishes transferred to the new Lothingland Rural District, apart from Gunton and some part parishes which were added to Lowestoft MB. In 1974 the area was divided between the new districts of Great Yarmouth (in Norfolk) and Waveney in Suffolk.

Statistics

Parishes
Mutford and Lothingland RD contained the parishes of Ashby, Barnby, Belton, Blundeston, Bradwell, Burgh Castle, Carlton Colville, Corton, Flixton, Fritton, Gisleham, Gunton, Herringfleet, Hopton on Sea, Kessingland, Lound, Mutford, Oulton, Pakefield, Rushmere and Somerleyton.

References

History of Suffolk
Districts of England created by the Local Government Act 1894
Rural districts of England
Borough of Great Yarmouth
Waveney District